Kenneth Jaden Hill (born December 22, 1999) is an American professional baseball pitcher in the Colorado Rockies organization. He played college baseball for the LSU Tigers.

Amateur career
Hill attended Ashdown High School in Ashdown, Arkansas, where he played baseball and football. In July 2017, he was invited and accepted an invitation to play in the Under Armour All-American Game at Wrigley Field. In 2018, his senior year, he went 7–0 with a 0.51 earned run average (ERA) and batted .540 with 11 home runs, earning the title of Arkansas Gatorade Player of the Year. He was selected by the St. Louis Cardinals in the 38th round of the 2018 Major League Baseball draft, but did not sign, and instead enrolled at Louisiana State University to play college baseball for the LSU Tigers.

In 2019, Hill's freshman season at LSU, he made two starts and pitched two innings before undergoing surgery on his collarbone, forcing him to miss the remainder of the season. He was named the SEC Freshman of the Week after pitching five scoreless innings with eight strikeouts in his collegiate debut against the Air Force Academy. Prior to the 2020 season, he was named an All-American by Collegiate Baseball Newspaper. He returned healthy in 2020, and began pitching out of the bullpen. He threw  scoreless innings before the season was ended early due to the COVID-19 pandemic. In April 2021, Hill suffered a torn ulnar collateral ligament in his right elbow that required Tommy John surgery, and was ruled out for the remainder of the season. Over seven starts before the injury, he went 2-3 with a 6.67 ERA and 25 strikeouts over  innings.

Professional career
Hill was selected by the Colorado Rockies in the second round with the 44th overall selection of the 2021 Major League Baseball draft. He signed with the Rockies for a $1.7 million signing bonus. Hill returned to throwing live batting practice in mid-June.

Hill made his professional debut in July 2022 with the Rookie-level Arizona Complex League Rockies and after seven starts was promoted to the Fresno Grizzlies of the Single-A California League. Over  innings between the two teams, Hill posted a 3.06 ERA with 25 strikeouts and six walks.

See also
List of baseball players who underwent Tommy John surgery

References

External links

LSU Tigers bio

1999 births
Living people
African-American baseball players
Baseball players from Arkansas
Baseball pitchers
LSU Tigers baseball players
21st-century African-American sportspeople
Arizona Complex League Rockies players
Fresno Grizzlies players